Asura craigii is a moth of the  family Erebidae. It is found in Cameroon, Equatorial Guinea and Togo.

References

craigii
Moths of Africa
Moths described in 1893